Steven Nicolas Romero (June 21, 1955 – September 2, 1985) was an American professional wrestler better known by his ring name Jay Youngblood. He wrestled in the National Wrestling Alliance's Jim Crockett Promotions in a tag team with Ricky Steamboat. In addition, he wrestled with Championship Wrestling from Florida, Pacific Northwest Wrestling, NWA All-Star Wrestling and the American Wrestling Association.

Professional wrestling career
Romero started wrestling in 1975 in Amarillo under a mask and calling himself "Silver Streak". He then moved on to Pacific Northwest Wrestling, under the name of Jay Youngblood (a Native American gimmick). During his time in the Pacific Northwest he held the tag team titles with Joe Lightfoot, they were known as "The Indians". He wrestled in the National Wrestling Alliance's Jim Crockett Promotions (JCP) in a regular tag team with Ricky Steamboat. Also in JCP, he was known as "The Renegade".

In 1982, Steamboat and Youngblood were feuding with Boris Zhukov, Don Kernodle, and their manager Sgt. Slaughter. Zhukov, then known as Private Jim Nelson, later betrayed his team in favour of Youngblood and Steamboat. The rivalry culminated in a steel cage match on March 12, 1983 in Greensboro, North Carolina that was attended by 15,000 people, where Slaughter and Kernodle lost their NWA World Tag Team Championship to Steamboat and Youngblood. In June 1982 in Maple Leaf Wrestling, Youngblood defeated The Destroyer to win the NWA Canadian Television Championship. He was later defeated by Private Jim Nelson for the title. Steamboat and Youngblood also feuded with Jack and Jerry Brisco.

He went to Championship Wrestling from Florida in September 1984 where he and Mark Youngblood captured the Florida version of the NWA United States Tag Championship. Also in 1984, Youngblood wrestled in Puerto Rico for the World Wrestling Council (WWC). In 1985 Jay also wrestled in Memphis, Mexico and for Pro Wrestling USA.

Personal life
Romero was the son of wrestler Ricky Romero. He was the brother of wrestlers Chris and Mark Youngblood. He was married at the time of his death and left behind a daughter, Ricca. Youngblood has a son, Daniel, who served in the US Army.

Death
During a wrestling tour of the South Pacific, Youngblood was experiencing abdominal pain and went to the hospital where he was diagnosed with hemorrhagic pancreatitis. He started to develop abdominal sepsis and kidney failure before suffering a series of heart attacks. He was in a coma for two weeks before dying on September 2, 1985, in Parkville, Victoria, Australia. He is buried at Llano Cemetery by Cox Funeral Home at Amarillo, Texas, beside his parents Ricky and Stella Marrujo Romero.

Memorials
In April 2006 at local Amarillo indy-wrestling promotion West Texas Wrestling Legends, Jay's nephew "Radical" Ricky Romero III and Mike DiBiase teamed up as "Team 3G" (Team Third Generation Wrestlers) and went on to become the first-ever WTWL Jay Youngblood Memorial Tag Team Cup Tournament winners at "The Legacy of Legends" show. On April 27 and 28, 2007 Amarillo's Professional Wrestling Federation (formerly known as West Texas Wrestling Legends) held the second annual two night 2007 Jay Youngblood Memorial Tag Team Cup Tournament event that was won by "The Ruthless One" WidowMaker and Mosh Pit Mike of "Pain Inc." after they defeated Jay's nephew "Radical" Ricky Romero III and "The Hooligan" Austin Riley in the final round of the tournament. As winners of the Jay Youngblood Memorial Cup, WidowMaker and Mosh Pit Mike were also crowned the first-ever PWF Tag Team Champions.

Championships and accomplishments
All Japan Pro Wrestling
 World's Strongest Tag Determination League New Wave Award (1982) – with Ricky Steamboat
Cauliflower Alley Club
Family Wrestling Award (2015) – with Ricky Romero, Mark Youngblood, and Chris Youngblood
Championship Wrestling from Florida
NWA United States Tag Team Championship (Florida version) (2 times) – with Mark Youngblood
Maple Leaf Wrestling
NWA Canadian Television Championship (1 time)
Mid-Atlantic Championship Wrestling
NWA Mid-Atlantic Tag Team Championship (3 times) – with Porkchop Cash (1), Johnny Weaver (1) and Ricky Steamboat (1)
NWA World Tag Team Championship (Mid-Atlantic version) (5 times) - with Ricky Steamboat
NWA All-Star Wrestling
NWA Canadian Tag Team Championship (Vancouver version) (1 time) – with Joe Ventura
NWA Pacific Coast Heavyweight Championship (Vancouver version) (1 time) (last)
Pacific Northwest Wrestling
NWA Pacific Northwest Heavyweight Championship (4 times)
NWA Pacific Northwest Tag Team Championship (1 time) – with Joe Lightfoot
Salem City Tournament (1981)
Pro Wrestling Illustrated
Ranked No. 308 of the top 500 singles wrestlers in the "PWI Years" in 2003
Ranked No. 19 of the 100 best tag teams of the "PWI Years" with Ricky Steamboat in 2003
Western States Sports
NWA Western States Tag Team Championship (1 time) - with Ricky Romero
Wrestling Observer Newsletter
Tag Team of the Year (1983) with Ricky Steamboat

See also
 List of premature professional wrestling deaths

References

1955 births
1985 deaths
American male professional wrestlers
American professional wrestlers of Mexican descent
Faux Native American professional wrestlers
People from Fontana, California
Professional wrestlers from California
20th-century American male actors
American male actors of Mexican descent
20th-century professional wrestlers
NWA United States Tag Team Champions (Florida version)
NWA Canadian Television Champions
WCW World Tag Team Champions